Colwich Junction is a rail junction near the village of Little Haywood, in the county of Staffordshire, England. It is the junction between two routes of the West Coast Main Line: the Trent Valley line and the Stone to Colwich cutoff line. The junction was the site of the 1986 Colwich rail crash.

Routes
This provides a shorter route to Manchester Piccadilly than using lines via Stafford or Crewe, although the route via Crewe and Wilmslow is technically a faster route due to fewer speed restrictions on the route.

South of the junction, the line is quadruple tracked towards  & Rugby but to the north both lines continue as double track only (though the WCML remains so only for two miles before quadrupling once more again on the approaches to Stafford).  The main line dates from 1847 and was opened by the London and North Western Railway, whilst the branch towards Stone was opened by the NSR two years later.

Stations
There are currently no stations on the Colwich Junction to Stone line, local stopping services having been withdrawn by the LMS in January 1947. Although there were platforms on this line at Stone, they have been demolished.  There was a station at Colwich itself, but this closed in 1958.

Accident history
There was a rail accident here on Friday 19 September 1986, when two express passenger trains collided - see Colwich rail crash.

See also
 West Coast Main Line route modernisation

References

Rail transport in Staffordshire
Rail junctions in England
Railway lines in the West Midlands (region)